Rate of change may refer to:

 Rate of change (mathematics), either average rate of change or instantaneous rate of change
 Instantaneous rate of change, rate of change at a given instant in time
 Rate of change (technical analysis), a simple technical indicator in finance

See also 
 Rate of climb or rate of altitude change in aeronautics
 Rate (disambiguation)
 Change (disambiguation)
 Frequency (disambiguation)
 Gradient (disambiguation)